The 2014 Southwestern Athletic Conference baseball tournament was held at Wesley Barrow Stadium in New Orleans, Louisiana, from May 14 through 18, 2014.   won their sixteenth tournament championship, and second in a row, to earn the conference's automatic bid to the 2014 NCAA Division I baseball tournament.  The event was originally scheduled for LaGrave Field in Fort Worth, Texas, but was moved due to concerns about player safety.

The double elimination tournament features the top four teams from each division, leaving one team from each division out of the field.  Mississippi Valley State and Southern did not qualify for the Tournament.

Seeding and format
The top four finishers in each division will be seeded one through four, with the top seed from each division facing the fourth seed from the opposite division in the first round, and so on.  The teams then play a two bracket, double-elimination tournament with a one-game final between the winners of each bracket.  Alabama State and Arkansas–Pine Bluff won their respective divisions and earned the top seeds.

Bracket

* - Indicates game required 11 innings.† - Indicates game required 10 innings.

All-Tournament Team
The following players were named to the All-Tournament Team.

Most Valuable Player
Desmond Russell was named Tournament Most Valuable Player.  Russell was a pitcher for Jackson State, recording 11 strikeouts in the tournament.

References

Tournament
Southwestern Athletic Conference Baseball Tournament
Southwestern Athletic Conference baseball tournament
Southwestern Athletic Conference baseball tournament